Kavitha Anandasivam is a Sri Lankan Australian actress, known for starring in SBS's 2019 mini-series, The Hunting. In 2019, the Casting Guild of Australia named her among their 10 "Rising Stars" to watch. She appeared in 2021's Aftertaste. She has lived in Singapore before settling in Adelaide.

References

External links

Living people
2002 births
Actresses from Adelaide
People from Colombo
Sri Lankan emigrants to Australia
Sri Lankan emigrants to Singapore
Australian child actresses
21st-century Sri Lankan actresses
21st-century Australian actresses